Kanelstenger, or brune pinner is a Norwegian cookie coated in cinnamon, syrup, and chopped almonds frequently served during Christmastime. It is characterized by its crispy texture and flat, stick shape, typically served in bundles.

See also 
 List of Norwegian desserts
 Norwegian cuisine

References 

Norwegian desserts
Christmas food